Naviculavolva massierorum is a species of sea snail, a marine gastropod mollusk in the family Ovulidae, the ovulids, cowry allies or false cowries.

Description
The shell size varies between 7 mm and 19 mm

Distribution
This species is distribute din the Indian Ocean along Tanzania, Mozambique and South Africa.

References

- Fehse D. (1999). Studies on Ovulidae and Triviidae of Mozambique and Réunion. La Conchiglia 31(292): 47–55, 63
 Lorenz F. & Fehse D. (2009). The Living Ovulidae - A manual of the families of Allied Cowries: Ovulidae, Pediculariidae and Eocypraeidae. Conchbooks, Hackenheim, Germany

External links
 

Ovulidae
Gastropods described in 1999